Teaching Exceptional Children (styled TEACHING Exceptional Children) is a bimonthly peer-reviewed academic journal covering the field of special education. The editor-in-chief is Dawn A Rowe (East Tennessee State University). It was established in 1968 and is published by SAGE Publications on behalf of the Council for Exceptional Children.

Abstracting and indexing 
TEACHING Exceptional Children is abstracted and indexed in:
 ERIC
 NISC

See also 
 Exceptional Children

External links 
 

SAGE Publishing academic journals
English-language journals
Special education journals
Publications established in 1968
Bimonthly journals